Martínez or Martinez may refer to:

Places

Argentina
 Martínez, Buenos Aires
 Coronel Martínez de Hoz, Buenos Aires Province

France
 Hôtel Martinez, in Cannes

Mexico
 Martínez de la Torre, Veracruz

Spain
 Martínez, Ávila, a municipality in the province of Ávila, Castile and León

United States
 Martinez, California
 Martinez, Georgia
 Martinez, Texas

Other uses
 Martinez (band), Swedish dansband
 Martinez (cocktail), a cocktail related to the Martini
 Martínez (surname)

See also
 Justice Martinez (disambiguation)